John Roper (died 1618) was a British aristocrat, created the first Baron Teynham in 1616.

The Roper family is an English aristocratic family that can be traced back to 1066 following the Norman Conquest by residing in Derbyshire. Members of the family have held three hereditary titles: Viscount of Baltinglass, Baron Dacre of Glanton, and Baron of Teynham.

Early life
John Roper was the eldest son of Christopher Roper, of Lynsted, Kent, and his wife Elizabeth Blore. The Ropers (whose original surname had been Musard) were an old Kentish family with strong Catholic connections. His uncle's wife, Margaret Roper, was the daughter of Sir Thomas More.

Later life and peerage
John succeeded to his father's manor of Badmangore on the latter's death. In 1599, he had a new house, Lynsted Lodge, built at Lynsted. Upon the accession of James I, John was the first of the gentry in his county to proclaim the new king, for which service he was knighted in 1616 (although according to other sources he may have already been knighted by Queen Elizabeth in 1587) and raised to the peerage as Lord Teynham on the same day.

His contribution of £10,000 to the new king's coffers may also have played a role in his elevation to the nobility. Ned Wymarke joked that he was "Baron of Ten M", 10 thousand pound. According to Gardiner, however, Roper's ennoblement was not any sort of sign of gratitude from the king; rather, it was granted (after the payment of £10,000) as a way to induce Roper to relinquish an office he held in the King's Bench. King James hoped to grant the office to his grasping favorite, George Villiers, 1st Duke of Buckingham, and viewed Roper as an obstacle to the plan.

Marriage and family
He firstly married Elizabeth Parke, daughter of Richard Parke of Malmaine. They had three children, including;

 Christopher, who would succeed to the barony.
 Elizabeth, who married George Vaux, son of William Vaux, 3rd Baron Vaux of Harrowden, and was the mother of the 4th Baron Vaux
 Jane (or Mary), who married Sir Robert Lovell of Martin Abbey, and was questioned on suspicion of involvement in the Gunpowder Plot. After July 1606, she lived as a widow in Brussels, and her house was robbed during religious processions at Easter 1610.

John Roper's first wife Elizabeth died in 1567. Roper married a second time to Elizabeth Dyon some time between 24 September 1583 (when her first husband died) and 4 April 1584. His second wife also predeceased him, dying prior to 22 September 1593, they had no children.

Death
John Roper died in 1618, and was succeeded in his title by his son Christopher. He was buried in the south chancel of the church at Lynsted Lodge.

A general history of the Roper family and their landholdings
The estates owned by the Roper family in the United Kingdom include Hyde and Charlton, Bradford, Pylewell Park, Candelwick, Galway Estates and Trimdon Estates. Additional estates include Saint Dunstans, Chestfeild, Cheselherst, Brambiltighe, and Modingham among others. Kent Estates were acquired in 15th century by Lord John Roper. Galway estates (181 acres) were acquired in 19th century by Sir Henry Roper.

In 1788, Henry Francis Roper, the 14th Baron of Teynham inherited his cousin’s John Barnewall Curzon’s wealth and estate at Water Perry, Northamptonshire when he died. Henry legally added his name to his by Royal Licence and joined House of Roper and House of Curzon in his honour and became Henry Francis Roper-Curzon. Today, his descendants such as John Roper-Curzon, David Roper-Curzon, and Harry Roper-Curzon still go by both names.

References

1618 deaths
1
English Roman Catholics
17th-century English nobility
17th-century Roman Catholics
People from Lynsted